Quercus undata is a species of plant in the family Fagaceae. It is endemic to Mexico. It is placed in section Quercus.

References

undata
Endemic oaks of Mexico
Flora of the Sierra Madre Occidental
Trees of Durango
Data deficient plants
Taxonomy articles created by Polbot